Lauro is a town and comune (municipality) in the province of Avellino, Campania, southern Italy. It is located in lower Irpinia, in a woody valley. Sights include the remains of a 1st-century BC Roman thermae.

References

Cities and towns in Campania